U.S. Highway 23 (US 23)  is a United States Numbered Highway that runs from Jacksonville, Florida to Mackinaw City, Michigan. In the U.S. state of Florida, US 23 is concurrent with US 1 south of Alma, Georgia, except in Downtown Jacksonville. US 23 is also concurrent with US 301 between Homeland, Georgia and Callahan. In the Jacksonville area, US 23 is the unsigned State Road 139 (SR 139), which also continues east from the south end of US 23 along SR 10A to SR 115 near the Mathews Bridge.

Route description
U.S. Route 23 begins at US 1 (Main Street) at the northern end of downtown Jacksonville, starting as a one-way pair, with the northbound lanes meeting with Florida State College. It is also unsigned SR 139 from its southern terminus to its interchange with US 1 in northwestern Jacksonville (SR 139 continues east along SR 10A from the end of US 23 to SR 115). Additionally, it has a wrong-way concurrency with US 17 from the beginning at US 1 to Exits 363B and 363C on Interstate 95. West of I-95, US 23 ends the one-way pair, continuing as Kings Road through northwestern Jacksonville, as an off-grid road.  A few miles to the northwest in the Grand Park section of Jacksonville, US 23 meets with US 1/SR 15 (Martin Luther King Jr. Parkway), running concurrently with the highway through the rest of its journey through Florida.  The road continues northwest, intersecting with Interstate 295 (I-295) and eventually makes its way out of Jacksonville.  At Callahan, US 1/US 23 meets US 301, beginning a three-way concurrency as the road continues northward towards the St. Mary's River, leaving Florida and entering Georgia.

History

US 23 was extended into Florida in about 1950.

Major intersections

See also

References

External links

23
 
023
023
023